Leuconoe or Leukonoe, or Leuconoeum or Leukonoion (Λευκόνοιον), or Leukonefs (Λευκονοιεύς) was a deme of ancient Attica of the phyle of Leontis.

Its site is tentatively located near modern Peristeri.

People
Demochares, a leading Athenian politician in 307-302 BCE.

References

External links
References to the deme in ancient sources at attalus.org

Populated places in ancient Attica
Former populated places in Greece
Demoi